The 2019 Swope Park Rangers season is the club's fourth year of play and their first season in the Eastern Conference of the newly renamed USL Championship, the top tier of  United Soccer League. The second tier of the United States Soccer Pyramid. The Rangers will continue play at  Children's Mercy Park after complications with Shawnee Mission District Stadium in Overland Park, Kansas.

Previous season 
The 2018 Swope Park Rangers season finished the year with a record of 15-8-11 and 7th in the Western Conference qualifying for the 2018 USL Playoffs.

In the first round, Swope Park defeated #2 seed Sacramento Republic 2–1. In the conference semi-finals, the Rangers lost to #3 Phoenix Rising 4–2.

Current roster

Player movement

In

Out

Competitions

Preseason

USL Championship

Standings

Results summary

Results by matchday

Matches

U.S. Open Cup 

Due to their affiliation with a higher division professional club (Sporting Kansas City), SPR was one of 13 teams expressly forbidden from entering the Cup competition.

Player statistics

Squad appearances and goals

Last updated on 26 August 2019.

|-
! colspan="14" style="background:#dcdcdc; text-align:center"|Goalkeepers

|-
! colspan="14" style="background:#dcdcdc; text-align:center"|Defenders

|-
! colspan="14" style="background:#dcdcdc; text-align:center"|Midfielders

|-
! colspan="14" style="background:#dcdcdc; text-align:center"|Forwards

|-
! colspan=14 style=background:#dcdcdc; text-align:center| Players who have made an appearance or had a squad number this season but have left the club

|-
|}

Top scorers

References

Swope
Swope
Sporting Kansas City II seasons
Swope